The 1924 Illinois Fighting Illini football team represented the University of Illinois in the 1924 Big Ten Conference football season. The Fighting Illini compiled a 6–1–1 record (3–1–1 against Western Conference opponents) and outscored their opponents by a combined total of 204 to 71. This was the junior season for hall-of-fame All-American halfback Harold "Red" Grange. End/tackle Frank E. Rokusek was the team captain.

Schedule

Awards and honors
 Red Grange (Halfback)
Chicago Tribune Silver Football Inaugural award as conference MVP
Consensus First-Team All-American (halfback)
Clarence Muhl (End)
All-American (end)

References

Illinois
Illinois Fighting Illini football seasons
Illinois Fighting Illini football